WSBC is a radio station broadcasting a variety format.

WSBC may also refer to:

 Walnut Street Baptist Church (Waterloo, Iowa), listed on the National Register of Historic Places in Iowa
 Walnut Street Baptist Church (Louisville, Kentucky), a former megachurch in Louisville, Kentucky
 Wandsworth School Boys' Choir, a defunct English choir
 Wealthy Street Baptist Church, a fundamentalist church in Michigan
 Westminster School Boat Club, a boys' boat club in London
 White Sea – Baltic Canal, a ship canal in Russia
 Wyoming Southern Baptist Convention, a group of churches affiliated with the Southern Baptist Convention